FC Astrateks Astrakhan was a Russian football team from Astrakhan. It played professionally from 1992 to 1996. Their best result was 8th place in Zone 1 of the Russian Second Division in 1993.

External links
  Team history at KLISF

Association football clubs established in 1992
Association football clubs disestablished in 1997
Defunct football clubs in Russia
Sport in Astrakhan
1992 establishments in Russia
1997 disestablishments in Russia